Guajiru is an indigenous fishing village on the coast of Ceará and has about 800 inhabitants from 100 families. Guajiru lies in the municipality of Trairi and is about a 130 km drive from the state capital Fortaleza, Brazil.

"Guajiru" is a Tupi name of a peach-like fruit that grows in the dunes all over the Brazilian northeast.

Infrastructure and transport

Guajiru has one main road with two names. Until the bridge it is called "Rua dos Castanholas," and after the bridge, "Rua Principal de Gaujiru."

The square is situated about 300 meters after the bridge and has the church, shops, and restaurants. Some 600 meters further is the area where a lot of Europeans live and eventually the end of the road.

The road is made of a sort of cobblestone, but sharper, and the maximum speed is 40 km/hr.

Three times a day a Fretcar bus drives up and down from and to Fortaleza. More frequently one can take either a taxi bus or the Abacate to Flecheiras and Trairi.

Fishing

Fishing is the main source of income for the people of Guajiru. All the men sail the sea on jangadas which are rather small and simplistic. These courageous men used to sail 200 km, being away for a week. Nowadays a mere 50 km is travelled to get lobsters and camurupin.

The fishermen leave around 4 o'clock in the morning for the beach to prepare their boats and head out to sea. The fish are taken to a central place to immediately be distributed to the locals. Every family has the right to receive fish, no one is left behind. The lobsters are taken to another place where they are sorted by size and then sold to tradesmen in Trairi or Fortaleza. The locals usually use the lobsters' heads to make soup.

Despite the small size of the ships (10 by 4 feet) there are hardly any accidents, but if they happen heroic tales are dragged out of them that are told for many years. The accidents usually involve the gigantic waves caught by tankers. The tankers couldn't see the fishermen since they didn't carry any lights. These accidents don't really happen anymore because the fishermen don't sail out that far anymore and now can take safe flashlights instead of fire.

The fishing is still dangerous; in May 2014 a ship was found with three fishermen from a little village near Fortaleza. They got lost on the sea for three days, and one of them even died on the boat, before they saw land and were found in Guajiru. This is a reminder of just how dangerous the water can be.

Nature

Most of Guajiru's natural vegetation is still intact. The village and surroundings are full with palm trees, banana plants, cashew trees, castanholas, sugar canes, guajiru and mango trees. In the sand dunes behind the village there are hardly any plants at all. Cows and donkeys walk around freely and wind blows hard off the steep dunes. In the middle of Guajiru there is a stream coming from the dunes.

Dunes

The sand dunes which also make the Nordeste famous are "moving" dunes. Because there is no vegetation, nothing holds the sand together, and the strong winds that come from the sea blow the sand away in such a rate that every three months you can visually see a difference in height of the dunes. At the bottom of most of the dunes used to be water pools which formed natural reservoirs for dry times. After the construction of the windmills, most of them were closed down, creating a water problem in the village. In some places the dunes have moved so far that you can see 100-year-old "iron wood". This is a tree that is so strong, you can't break it by hand. The area used to be scattered with them.

Tourism
The strong winds and high waves during high tide make perfect conditions for nautical sports like kite surfing. At low tide, pools appear on the beach and corals are visible under a turquoise blue sea. The dunes are beautiful to visit by buggy.

Trips can be booked anywhere in the village, the most handy place would be one of the resorts where they have got all the info and speak English.

Patron

Nossa Senhora dos Navegantes is the patron of the fishermen. Every year in August during the Semana Santa there are celebrations to thank God and Mary for the fish and the safe homecoming of the men who went to sea. The church of Guajiru, named after the patron, was built in 1975 under the lead of Father Tomás en mister Zezeca. Everyone in the community helped to get the building materials and constructed the building.

References

Populated places in Ceará